TV4 or TV 4 may refer to:

TV4 (Poland), a private Polish television station
TV4 (Sweden), a Swedish television network
TV4 Group, owners of the Swedish television station
South African Broadcasting Corporation TV4, a channel operated by the state-owned broadcaster
Four (New Zealand TV channel), a defunct New Zealand television channel formerly named TV4
Television 4, a digital advertorial datacasting service
Vision Four, a cable television channel in Malaysia
TV 4 (Estonia)
TV-4, former name of Turkmenistan (TV channel)
TV4 (Guanajuato), the state network of the Mexican state of Guanajuato

See also
Channel 4 (disambiguation)
C4 (disambiguation)